Ban Tan may refer to:

 Ban Tan Subdistrict in Bamnet Narong District, Chaiyaphum, Thailand
 Ban Tan, Chiang Mai, a subdistrict in Hot District, Chiang Mai, Thailand